Southern soul is a type of soul music that emerged from the Southern United States. The music originated from a combination of styles, including blues (both 12 bar and jump), country, early R&B, and a strong gospel influence that emanated from the sounds of Southern black churches. Bass guitar, drums, horn section, and gospel roots vocal are important to soul groove. This rhythmic force made it a strong influence in the rise of funk music. The terms "deep soul", "country soul", "downhome soul" and "hard soul" have been used synonymously with "Southern soul".p. 18

History

1960s–1980s

Some soul musicians were from southern states such as Georgia natives Otis Redding and James Brown, Rufus Thomas and Bobby "Blue" Bland(from Tennessee), Eddie Floyd (from Alabama), Lee Dorsey (from Louisiana). Southern soul was influenced by blues and gospel music.

Southern soul was at its peak late 1960s, when Memphis soul was popular. In 1963, Stan Lewis founded Jewel Records in Shreveport, Louisiana, along with two subsidiary labels, Paula and Ronn. Jewel and Ronn Records were among the leaders for R&B, blues, soul and gospel tunes. Lewis signed artists such as  John Lee Hooker, Charles Brown, Bobby Rush, Sam "T-Bird" Jensen, Buster Benton, Toissaint McCall, Lightnin’ Hopkins, Ted Taylor and Little Johnny Taylor. In 1966, the Shreveport-based Murco Records released "Losin' Boy" by Eddy Giles, which registered for five weeks on Cashbox magazine's Hot 100. Murco Records had soul chart success with its other artist included Reuben Bell and the Belltones.

The other significant contributors were Stax Records and their house band Booker T. & the MGs. The Stax label's most successful artist of the 1960s, Otis Redding, was influenced by fellow Georgia native Little Richard and the more cosmopolitan sounds of Mississippi-born Sam Cooke. Other Stax artists of note included Carla Thomas, Eddie Floyd, Johnnie Taylor, the Staple Singers, the Dramatics (from Detroit) and Isaac Hayes. Atlantic Records artists Sam & Dave's records were released on the Stax label and featured the MGs. Wilson Pickett launched his solo career through his collaboration with the Stax team.

After Sam & Dave moved from Stax to Atlantic Records, Stax producer David Porter and his songwriting and production partner Isaac Hayes decided to put together a new vocal group of two men and two women. They recruited J. Blackfoot, together with Norman West, Anita Louis, and Shelbra Bennett, to form The Soul Children. Between 1968 and 1978, The Soul Children had 15 hits on the R&B chart, including three that crossed over to the Billboard Hot 100, and recorded seven albums.

Another Memphis label, Goldwax Records, featured O.V. Wright, James Carr, and Spencer Wiggins, while Al Green, Don Bryant, and Ann Peebles recorded for Memphis's Hi Records, where they were produced by Willie Mitchell. Also influential was the "Muscle Shoals Sound", originating from Muscle Shoals, Alabama. The Muscle Shoals Rhythm Section played on hits by many Stax artists during the late 1960s through the mid-1970s, and Atlantic Records artists Wilson Pickett, Percy Sledge, Joe Tex and Aretha Franklin. In 1983, former Soul Children singer J. Blackfoot saw success on soul chart with his single "Taxi". Marvin Sease gained R&B hit "Candy Licker" in 1987.

1990s–present
After 1990, southern soul music was still recorded and performed by singers such as Sharon Jones, Charles Bradley, Peggy Scott-Adams, Trudy Lynn, Shirley Brown, Sir Charles Jones, Barbara Carr, Willie Clayton, Bobby Rush, Mel Waiters, Denise LaSalle, Gwen McCrae, Johnnie Taylor, William Bell, Roy C, Millie Jackson, and Sam Dees.

See also
 Northern soul
 Rhythm and blues
 Blues
 Soul music
 Gospel music
 Doo wop
 Funk
 Beach music

References

External links
 [ AllMusic Guide to R&B]
 Blues Critic Website dedicated to Southern Soul, Rhythm & Blues & Soul Blues Music
 Southern Soul  Top 30 Albums Monthly Southern Soul/R&B Top 30 Albums
 SouthernSoulRnB.com – Daddy B. Nice's comprehensive guide to today's Southern Soul Music
 Getbluesinfo.com – Southern Soul/Blues Channel:
 CarolinaSoul.Org
 beachmusic45.com - Southern Soul Beach Music Site

20th-century music genres
Soul
Soul music genres